Prakhon Chai is a district (amphoe) in the southern part of Buriram province, northeastern Thailand. The district lies approximately 50 km south of Buriram City.

Geography
NeighboUring districts are (from the south clockwise) Ban Kruat, Lahan Sai, Chaloem Phra Kiat, Nang Rong, Mueang Buriram, Phlapphla Chai of Buriram Province and Prasat of Surin province.

History
The district was renamed from Talung (ตะลุง) to Prakhon Chai in 1939.

In 1964, artwork depicting Buddhist figures, including Avalokitesvara, was discovered in Prakhon Chai. Originating from the pre-Angkor period, these figures reflect traditional Indian styles, as passed down through the Cambodian tradition of the Chenla Kingdom.

Motto
The Prakhon Chai District's Motto is "The Best of culture, Prasat Muang Tam, Jasmine rice, shrimp ferment, The Bird park and People are kind."

Administration
The district is divided into 16 sub-districts (tambon), which are further subdivided into 199 villages (muban). Prakhon Chai is a township (thesaban tambon) which covers parts of tambon Prakhon Chai. There are also 16 tambon administrative organizations (TAO).

Missing numbers are tambons which now form Phlapphla Chai District.

References

External links 
 amphoe.com

Prakhon Chai